Chris Stafford (born July 18, 1977, in Collinsville, Illinois) is an American actor. He has acted in film and television, including Law & Order. Stafford  starred in the coming-out movie Edge of Seventeen (1998). He received an Independent Spirit Award nomination for his role in the film.

References

External links
 

American male film actors
American male television actors
American lawyers
1977 births
Living people